Steven Woodmore (born 1959) is a retired British electronics salesman known for his rapid speech articulation, being able to articulate 637 words per minute (wpm), a speed four times faster than the average person. Woodmore was listed by the Guinness Book of World Records as the world's fastest talker, taking the helm from the previous record holder, John Moschitta Jr., in August 1990. Woodmore lost his record in 1995, when Sean Shannon from Canada was able to articulate 655 wpm.

Career

Fastest talker
Steve Woodmore can rapidly articulate at a rate of 637 words per minute, four times faster than the average human.

Woodmore first realised his skills at rapid speech when he was seven years old. At school, he was asked by his form teacher to recite an 8-minute speech, as a punishment for his talkativeness. It took him only two minutes.

On the British ITV television show Motor Mouth on 22 September 1990, Steve Woodmore recited a piece from the Tom Clancy novel "Patriot Games" in 56 seconds, yielding an average rate of 637 words per minute, breaking the previous record of 586 wpm, set by John Moschitta Jr. Guinness World Records listed Woodmore as the world's fastest talker. 

His ability to articulate at such a fast rate is apparently due to his recruiting more portions of his brain to the task than the average person, as shown in an fMRI scan.

Reality television
Woodmore has appeared on numerous television and radios shows, including BBC's 1Xtra Breakfast Show with Twin B and the documentary Stan Lee's Superhumans.

Electronics salesman
Woodmore worked as an electronics salesman for Currys, an electrical retailer in the United Kingdom and Ireland. He is now retired.

Other appearances
In June 2011, Woodmore launched the 5050 Phone a Friend nationwide competition, together with John Lonergan, at an event held in Dublin, in which the Irish public was challenged to beat Woodmore's world record of 637 wpm live on television. The finals were held on 10 September 2011.

Personal life
Woodmore lives in Chislehurst and is divorced with four children.

See also
Tachylalia, term for extremely rapid speech
Fran Capo, the fastest female speaker

References

External links
Steve Woodmore, World's Fastest Talker on YouTube
The world's fastest talker takes on the UK tax code on The Telegraph
 

1959 births
Living people
Salespeople